Rahmina Paullete, commonly known as Rahmina, is a Kenyan climate activist and a conservationist at Fridays for future as well as the head campaigner for #LetLakeVictoriaBreatheAgain  that advocates for the restoration of Lake Victoria. She is the founder of Kisumu environmental champions, an organization that does environmental, wildlife conservation and climate change advocacy.

Through eco innovation she is using water hyacinth to generate environmental friendly products named Rahmina Paullete Eco-products where she is the CEO

In recent years she has also been in  managerial positions including a focal point at food at COP,content creator at Sustory and a Fossil Fuel Treaty Champion

Education
Rahimna sat for her Kenya Certificate of Primary Education (KCPE) at the M.A  Junior Academy in 2019. She is currently studying from Kisumu Senior School.

Career
She is a member of the Wangari Maathai Foundation which develops courageous and responsible leadership among youth. She is also a campaigner at Food@COP, a movement led by a collection of young people from across the globe who believe that climate-friendly negotiations must take place over climate-friendly meals.She is also a content creator at Sustory and a campaigner at Fridays for Future activist too. In 2021, she was among the delegates who represented Kenya in the COP26 summit which happened in Glasgow, Scotland.

Awards
2016 Little Miss Kenya Kisumu County
 2016 Green Kids Award 
2018 Environmental Ambassador Kisumu County
 2018 Eco Warrior Tourism Change Maker Award
 2019 Little Princess of Africa 
 2019 Kidpreneur of The Year  (Lake Basin Innovation and Investment Week)
 2020 Reimagine a Park by Daima Green Spaces(Wangari Maathai Foundation)
 2020 Lake Hub Innovation Award (My Little Big Thing Incubation Finalist by Safaricom.
 2021 Build Your Business Potential Program Certificate Award by U.S Embassy Nairobi
 2021 Africa Kids Awards (Young Achievers Category)
 2021 ICPAC Climate Action Awards East Africa by IGAD
 2021 Top 100 Young African Conservation  Leaders Award by African Wildlife Foundation
 2022 Trailblazers Presidential Award
 2022 MTM Environmental Excellence Award

References

External references

Living people
Kenyan environmentalists
Kenyan women environmentalists
2005 births